Earlypay is an Australian company listed on the Australian Stock Exchange. Earlypay provides business finance to Australian small to medium size businesses.

History 
The business was founded by Daniel Riley and his father Greg Riley in 2001. Initially established as a labor hire business, the organisation translated to a finance provider for labor hire businesses as well as other sectors. Formerly, known as CML Group Limited, the business re-branded to Earlypay in November 2020. Earlypay provides business finance Australia-wide including Invoice Finance, Asset and Equipment Finance, and Foreign Exchange Payments and risk management.

In June 2022, Earlypay launched Earlypay Business Finance and Lending Training and Development Scholarship Program for finance professionals in partnership with Accendo Financial. Comprising an 11-week business finance and lending course, part of the program attracts CPD points with industry bodies; the Finance Brokers Association of Australia (FBAA), the Commercial and Asset Finance Brokers Association (CAFBA) and the Mortgage and Finance Association of Australia (MFAA).

In 2021, Earlypay raised $18 million AUD and acquired Skippr, an online invoice financing platform.

References

Australian companies established in 2001
Financial software
Microfinance
Financial technology
Companies listed on the Australian Securities Exchange
Companies based in Sydney